Thomas Dunne (10 March 1926 – 3 August 1990) was an Irish Fine Gael politician and Teachta Dála (TD) for Tipperary North from 1961 to 1977.

He was an unsuccessful candidate at the 1957 general election, but at the 1961 general election he defeated the Fianna Fáil TD Mary Ryan, and took his seat in the 17th Dáil. He was re-elected at the next three general elections, before losing his seat in the Fianna Fáil landslide at the 1977 general election to Michael Smith.

In 1973, Dunne was appointed a member of the second delegation from the Oireachtas to the European Parliament.

References

1926 births
1990 deaths
Fine Gael TDs
Members of the 17th Dáil
Members of the 18th Dáil
Members of the 19th Dáil
Members of the 20th Dáil
Fine Gael MEPs
MEPs for the Republic of Ireland 1973–1977
Politicians from County Tipperary